Death Is a Woman is a 1966 British mystery film directed by Frederic Goode and starring Mark Burns, Shaun Curry, William Dexter, Wanda Ventham, Terence De Marney and Trisha Noble. Location filming took place in Malta.

Plot
A British undercover agent (Burns) is sent to an island in the Mediterranean to identify how a heroin smuggling operation is distributing their product.

Cast
 Mark Burns as Dennis Parbury
 Shaun Curry as Joe
 William Dexter as Malo
 Wanda Ventham as Priscilla Blunstone-Smythe
 Terence De Marney as Jacomini
 Trisha Noble as Francesca (as Patsy Ann Noble)
 Mark Singleton as Costello, Head of the Police 
 Michael Brennan as Bonelli
 Anita Harris as Singer at Casino
 Blake Butler as Lift Operator
 Dulcie Bowman as Old Lady
 Tony Watham as himself
 Garth Adams as himself
 Caron Gardner as Mary

References

External links
 
 

1966 films
1966 crime drama films
1966 independent films
British crime drama films
British independent films
British mystery films
Films shot in Malta
1960s English-language films
1960s British films